In criminal law, the right to a speedy trial is a human right under which it is asserted that a government prosecutor may not delay the trial of a criminal suspect arbitrarily and indefinitely. Otherwise, the power to impose such delays would effectively allow prosecutors to send anyone to jail for an arbitrary length of time without trial.

Although it is important for the protection of speedy trial rights for there to be a court in which a defendant may complain about the unreasonable delay of the trial, it is also important that nations implement structures that avoid the delay.

Recognition of speedy trial rights
In jurisdictions with strong rule of law, the requirement of a "speedy trial" forces prosecutors to diligently build cases within a reasonable amount of time commensurate with the complexity and heinousness of the crimes of which suspects are accused. The right is based on the notion that long-term incarceration should normally be restricted to situations in which a judge or jury have determined a suspect has committed a crime.

The right to a speedy trial is codified in fundamental legal documents in several jurisdictions, and may be further defined by statutory law.

Canada
Speedy trial rights are recognized within Section Eleven of the Canadian Charter of Rights and Freedoms.

Europe

Within Europe, speedy trial rights are recognized by Article 6 of the European Convention on Human Rights.

In English law, this right was developed by the Assize of Clarendon in 1166 (a judge would be summoned if one was not immediately available) and Magna Carta in 1215 ("To no one will we sell, to no one will we refuse or delay, right or justice.").

India 
Right to speedy trial is guaranteed under Article 21 of the Constitution of India.

Japan 
The  of the Japanese Constitution states, "In all criminal cases the accused shall enjoy the right to a speedy and public trial by an impartial tribunal." , which had not held a court for 15 years, was dismissed by Supreme Court of Japan according to Article 37. After the Takada case, it is considered that dismissing judge should only apply if the accused ask acceleration of a trial.

Philippines
The Constitution of the Philippines states, "All persons shall have the right to a speedy disposition of their cases before all judicial, quasi-judicial, or administrative bodies."

United States
In the United States, basic speedy trial rights are protected by the Speedy Trial Clause of the Sixth Amendment to the United States Constitution. States may also offer additional speedy trial protections. In June 1776, a "speedy trial" provision was explicitly included in the Virginia Declaration of Rights by George Mason, its principal author.

The consequences of a speedy trial violation may require that the case be dismissed, although depending upon the circumstances it may be possible for the state to again initiate a criminal charge against a defendant despite a speedy trial violation.

See also
 Justice delayed is justice denied
 Right to a fair trial

References

Criminal law
Human rights
Time in government